Jack Cameron (7 March 1931 – 15 July 1987) was a Scottish footballer, who played for Dumbarton and Hartlepools.

References

1931 births
Scottish footballers
Dumbarton F.C. players
Hartlepool United F.C. players
Scottish Football League players
1987 deaths
English Football League players
Association football fullbacks
Sportspeople from Clydebank
Footballers from West Dunbartonshire